Events in the year 1858 in India.
Act of Parliament 1858

Incumbents
Charles Canning, Governor-General, afterwards Viceroy

Events
January – General Sir Hugh Rose begins the Central India campaign; Sir Colin Campbell begins the campaign to recapture Lucknow; trial of Bahadur Shah, King of Delhi, from 27 January
February – General Rose relieves Saugor; Campbell's Army of Oudh assembles on the Kanpur-Lucknow road to await Jang Bahadur's Gurkha army
March – Lucknow is recaptured on 21 March; Central India campaign continues
April – Battle of the Betwa; the city of Jhansi is stormed and captured (3–6 April); Azamgarh recaptured; advance on Kalpi (25 April); Campbell begins reconquest of Rohilkhand; Koer Singh leads a rising in Bihar; after his defeat he dies of his wounds
May – Battle of Bareilly followed by its recapture; Battle of Kunch; recapture of Jagdispur; reoccupation of Kalpi; Battle of Mohamdi (24 May) and end of resistance in Rohilkhand; rebels begin guerrilla war in the jungle; Tatya Tope and the Rani of Jhansi outside Gwalior
June – Gwalior army deserts to the rebels and Tatya Tope and the Rani of Jhansi seize Gwalior; General Rose marches from the Kalpi to Gwalior arriving on the 16th; next day the battle of Kotah-i-Serai and on the 19th the Battle of Gwalior; Gwalior fortress recaptured; during June guerrilla forces in Oudh, Bihar and along the Nepalese frontier are suppressed
July to December – suppression of guerrilla forces except in Rajputana and Central India
October to November – Bahadur Shah travels from Delhi into exile at Rangoon
1 November – the end of the British East India Company's rule in India is proclaimed

Law
August - Government of India Act 1858

Births
20 July - Baba Sawan Singh, Second Satguru of Radha Soami Satsang Beas (died 2 April 1948).
9 July – Kaikhusrau Jahan, Begum of Bhopal  (died 12 May 1930) 
7 November – Bipin Chandra Pal (died 1932) 
30 November – Jagadish Chandra Bose, physicist, biologist, botanist, archaeologist and science fiction writer (died 1937).

Deaths
Rani of Jhansi Lakshmibai, Queen of Jhansi State (d. 18 June at Gwalior, now Madhya Pradesh)

See also
Timeline of the Indian Rebellion of 1857

References

Edwardes, Michael (1975) Red Year. London: Sphere Books; pp. 154–55 (events of the rebellion)

 
India
Years of the 19th century in India